Cahersiveen, sometimes Cahirciveen, is a town on the N70 national secondary road in County Kerry, Ireland. As of the 2016 CSO census, the town had a population of 1,041.

Geography
Cahersiveen is on the slopes of 376-metre-high Bentee, and on the lower course of the River Ferta. It is the principal settlement of the Iveragh Peninsula, near Valentia Island, and is connected to the Irish road network by the N70 road.

History
Cahersiveen was where the first shots of the Fenian Rising were fired in 1867.

Railway
Cahersiveen was served from 1893 to 1960 by the Cahersiveen railway station on the Great Southern and Western Railway.

Mentions in literature
Patrick O'Brian's novel Post Captain gives Cahersiveen as the location of the character Stephen Maturin's childhood home in Ireland.

At present two Highlanders were talking slowly to an Irishman in Gaelic ... as he lay there on his stomach to ease his flayed back. 'I follow them best when I do not attend at all,' observed Stephen, 'it is the child in long clothes that understands, myself in Cahirciveen."

Cahirciveen is the central city in Brian Moore's futuristic novel "Catholics"

Places of interest

The Catholic church in the town is the only one in Ireland named after a layperson, Daniel O'Connell.

The decommissioned Royal Irish Constabulary barracks, dating to the 1870s and now a heritage centre, was built in the distinctive "Schloss" style favoured by its architect, Enoch Trevor Owen. Because of this, it is often claimed to have been mistakingly built from the plans for a British barracks in India – a common myth heard in many Irish garrison towns.

The stone forts of Cahergall and Leacanabuaile stand close to each other a short distance from the town.

The ruins of Ballycarbery Castle are near to Cahergall and Leacanabuaile.

The town falls within the Kerry International Dark-Sky Reserve, the first Gold Tier Reserve in the northern hemisphere and one of only four Gold Tier Dark-Sky Reserves on earth.

Education
The town's primary school, Scoil Saidbhín, opened in September 2015. This is an amalgamation of Scoil Mhuire, a boys' primary school and St Joseph's Convent, a girls' primary school. There are four primaries in the parish of Cahersiveen, including those in the town's hinterland: Aghatubrid National School, Coars National School, and Foilmore National School. Aghatubrid was established in 1964 and as of 2019 had about 75 students.

Coláiste Na Sceilge is the town’s co-educational secondary school. Over 530 pupils attend from all around the Iveragh Peninsula.

An t-Aonad Lán-Ghaeilge is the local Gaelscoil - an all Irish-speaking class for 1st to 3rd-year students, where students do all their learning through Irish.

Notable people 
 Donie O'Sullivan, journalist working for CNN
 Jerry Grogan
 Daniel O'Connell (The Liberator) 
 Monsignor Hugh O'Flaherty (The Scarlet Pimpernel)

Gallery

See also

List of towns and villages in Ireland
Market Houses in Ireland
Cahirciveen railway station

References

Towns and villages in County Kerry
Iveragh Peninsula
Cahersiveen